Alcis postlurida is a moth of the family Geometridae. It is found in south-east Asia, including China, Bhutan and Taiwan.

Subspecies
Alcis postlurida postlurida
Alcis postlurida undularia Inoue, 1978 (Taiwan)

References

Moths described in 1978
Boarmiini
Moths of Asia